The Granite Belt is an area of the Great Dividing Range in the Darling Downs region of Queensland and the New England region of New South Wales, Australia.  The Granite Belt is centred on the town of Stanthorpe. The cool, high country of the granite belt is located on Queensland's southern border.  It is the northernmost part of the New England Tablelands.

The area gains its name from the predominantly granite rocks that distinguish it from other areas that make up much of South East Queensland. The Granite Belt is known for its spectacular flowers, and produces virtually all of Queensland's $40 million apple crop from one million trees grown by 55 orchardists.

The area also lies within the Southern Downs region.  Including the town of Warwick, the region has a population of 32,600 people. And is part of the Southern Downs Region local government area. The major river in the region is the Condamine River, a tributary of the Murray River.

Climate
The Granite Belt has a subtropical highland climate that shares similarities to a typical oceanic climate. Under the Köppen climate classification system this would be called a Cfb climate. It is distinguished by its elevation, which makes it the coldest part of Queensland. Being amongst the highest altitude viticultural regions in Australia, it is an ideal climate for grapes, apples, stone fruit and many other fruits and vegetables with the exception of a tendency for hail. Winter months can be very cold on the Granite Belt, and night-time frost is very common. Bleak, overcast conditions on rare occasions bring hail, sleet, and snow. The area has received significant snowfalls in 1984, 2007 and 2015. The elevation creates a climate of four distinct seasons on the Granite Belt.

The area is a popular tourist destination, particularly for the short-break drive market from South East Queensland and northern New South Wales. The boom in wine tourism has been a key driver, and while winter is popular, the region benefits from being a cool contrast to coastal humidity in the summer. Despite spring frosts and variable soils Granite Belt grapes and wines are considered high quality.

Soils

The regions soils are derived from the parent rocks of Ruby Creek Granite and Stanthorpe Adamellite that form the northern section of the New England Batholith. They are typically sandy loam to clay loam surface soils with clay or parent rock at depth.

Towns
The town of Dalveen is in the north of the Granite Belt. Other villages include Applethorpe, Amiens, Ballandean, Glen Aplin, Passchendaele, Thulimbah, Pozieres, and Wallangarra, in the south at the border with New South Wales. Liston is a small village in New South Wales that is considered part of the Granite Belt.

Attractions
Stanthorpe and the surrounding Granite Belt and Granite Highlands area of South East Queensland and Northern New South Wales are the centre of a booming winery and national parks tourist destination. There are more than 50 wineries in the Granite Belt area. The Granite Belt national parks are Girraween, Bald Rock, Sundown, and Boonoo Boonoo. The region operates its own wine and tourism marketing body named Granite Belt Wine Country.

There is a wide range of restaurants, accommodation places and other tourist venues. Backpacking is popular and there is large demand for fruit and vegetable pickers from November until May each year.
The area is Queensland's premier wine region and home to the Queensland College of Wine Tourism. Many of the fifty-plus wineries in the region have enjoyed significant success with Shiraz, Cabernet Sauvignon, Merlot and Chardonnay for some years.  Recently Verdelho has performed very well and many wineries are experimenting with alternative grape varieties, including Nebbiolo, Sangiovese and Petit verdot.

Part of the Granite Belt is reserved as Girraween National Park, which features granite outcroppings such as the Pyramids, and an abundance of fauna and flora. 'Girraween' can be translated as "place of flowers" in the Aboriginal language from which it is taken.  The latter are particularly in evidence in spring, when wildflowers explode into evidence. The area is home to at least 800 species of flowering plants. The botanical group known as the Stanthorpe Rare Flower Consortium has been established as a result of the region's significant floral heritage. Some of these plants include ground orchids, rock roses, pea-flowers and native bluebells.

Further east towards the coast is the Bald Rock National Park and Boonoo Boonoo National Park.  Towards the west of the district is the Sundown National Park.  The granite boulders of the region attract rock-climbers, and bush-walkers like to explore the little-known Underground River. 

The possibility of experiencing snow on the ground in Queensland is another tourist attraction for the region.

History

The district was first inhabited by the Githabul and Kambuwal peoples. These Indigenous people groups inhabited the land for ten's of thousands of years prior to European exploration and settlement. European settlement began when the land was first explored by Allan Cunningham in 1827. Cunninghams Gap and the Cunningham Highway were named after him.

A number of large pastoral stations were established in the region:
 1840: Ballandean Run by Robert Ramsay Mackenzie
 1842: Maryland Run with a capacity of 24,000 sheep by Matthew Henry Marsh
 1843: Pikedale Run with a capacity of 24,000 sheep by Captain Pike
 1844: Glen Lyon Run by Alexander McLeod
 1860: Folkestone Run by Matthew Henry Marsh
 Nundubbermere Run
 Pike's Creek Run
 Terrica Run
 Waroo Run

During the following decade, mining of gold, copper and tin brought permanent European settlement to the district.

In 1881, the railway to Warwick was extended to Stanthorpe and then to the border in 1887, when Wallangarra was established.

The countryside around the Granite Belt, after World War I, was given to some returning soldiers as gifts or payment for their services in the war. As such, many of the rural districts are named after battles that took place in France, such as Amiens and Pozieres. These places were, at one point, rather busy and well-populated, but as Stanthorpe grew and returned soldiers grew frustrated with farming, the districts eventually died as many families left. In some places, where there were once Blue Nurse outposts and many stores, all that remain are small primary schools, while in other districts the post-war past remains only in the name.

The region's first wine grapes were planted in 1965.

See also

 Stanthorpe, Queensland
 Darling Downs, Queensland
 New England, New South Wales
 Regions of Queensland
 Tourism in Australia

References

External links
  Granite Net web page
  Southern Downs Regional Council
 Granite Belt Wine & Tourism: a not-for-profit organisation that promotes the regions wine and tourism industry.
 At Our Table: The Granite Belt digital story investigating Granite Belt's Wine Industry. Available on the State Library of Queensland online catalogue 
 The Localist - Granite Belt Website and blog hub with practical tips from locals. Your go-to guide to visiting the Granite Belt.
 Soldier settlements of Queensland's Granite Belt digital story exploring impact of Soldier Settlements on the naming of locations in Granite Belt and their impact on it's citizens. Available on the State Library of Queensland online catalogue.

Regions of Queensland
Darling Downs
Wine regions of Australia
Tourist attractions in Queensland
Belt regions